Académie Super Olympique d'une Afrique Renaissante, commonly known as SOAR and formerly known as CO Coyah, is a Guinean football club located in Ratoma, Guinea. The club competes in the Ligue 1 pro, the top division of football in Guinea. SOAR has established itself as a talent generator developing young players most notably Morlaye Sylla.

History 
Coyah was first promoted into the Guinée Championnat National for the 2016–17 season.
Founded as Club Olympique de Coyah (CO Coyah or short), had pretty rough times in the league bouncing back between the first and second league. In 2019 as CO Coyah had been promoted they had been bought by Almamy Saidou Sylla who rebranded the club as SOAR. The club became a talent generator focusing on promoting young players. The same season the club finished 4th. In the 2021/22 the club finished second runners up to Horoya AC. The club developed many African talents such as Morlaye Sylla  and  Béni Makouana.

Colours and badge 
Coyah's colours are Blue and Black.

Former managers
 Rachid Ghaflaoui (2019-2020)

References

External links 
 FDB profile
 GSA Profile
 Socerway Profile

Football clubs in Guinea